The Rivière du Curé (English: Priest's river or Curé River) is a tributary of the northwest shore of the Saint-Laurent river, flowing in the municipality of Saint-Augustin-de-Desmaures, in Agglomération de Québec, in the administrative region of Capitale-Nationale, in the province from Quebec, to Canada.

The Rivière du Curé's valley is mainly served by chemin du Roy and chemin Tessier, especially for the needs of residents in the urban area of Saint-Augustin-de-Desmaures.

The surface of the Curé river (except the rapids areas) is generally frozen from the beginning of December to the end of March; safe circulation on the ice is generally done from the end of December to the beginning of March. The water level of the river varies with the seasons and the precipitation; the spring flood occurs in March or April.

Geography 
The Curé river has its source at the confluence of two urban streams, on the west side of the hamlet Le Faubourg-L'Erpinière in Saint-Augustin-de-Desmaures.

The Curé River flows into Anse à Gagnon on the northwest bank of the St. Lawrence River.

Toponymy 
The toponym "Rivière du Curé" was formalized on March 9, 19838 at the Commission de toponymie du Québec.

Notes and references

Appendices

Related articles 
 Agglomeration of Quebec
 Saint-Augustin-de-Desmaures
 List of rivers of Quebec

Rivers of Capitale-Nationale